Kollengode is one of the major towns in Palakkad district, Kerala, India. Kollengode is well known for the culture of Kerala. Kollengode Town is the headquarters of Kollengode Grama Panchayat and Kollengode Block Panchayat. Kollengode is one of the major tourist spots of Palakkad district. It is located about 26 km from Palakkad.

A number of archaeological and historic sites, which have potential for tourism development, are located in and around Kollengode.

Demographics
 India census, Kollengode-I had a population of 18,583 with 9,068 males and 9,515 females.

22 km away from Palakkad (Palakkad–Kollengode Route) and 65 km from Thrissur (NH 544 and SH 58)

Transport
Kollengode railway station is located at Oottara and it is connected with Palakkad, Ernakulam, Thiruvananthapuram, Pollachi, Palani, Madurai, Thiruchendur,

Kollengode is also connected to major bus routes. State highway SH-58 is passing through Kollengode. The Kollengode-Palakkad route is one of the major roads in the state. Buses are available to Palakkad, Thrissur, Ernakulam, Calicut, Coimbatore, Pollachi, etc.

The Nearest Airport is Coimbatore which is around 70 km from Kollengode. Cochin International Airport is around 110 km away from Kollengode and distance to the Calicut Airport is around 125 km.

Attractions 
The historic Gayathripuzha River, a tributary of Bharathappuzha is flowing near to the town.

 Popular Tourist spot
 Seetharkundu waterfalls
 Palakapandi waterfalls
 Kollengode (Vengunad) Palace
 Govinda Mala Hills
 Paddy Fields and Nature Scenery
 Hill valleys
 Agraharams
 Dams and reservoirs
 Various film shooting locations: Kollengode is a popular location for film shootings; numerous hit movies have been shot here.

Festivals 
December and January is a season of festivals in Kollengode. These include:
Kollengode Pulikkode Dharmasastha Temple Arattu
 Thiru Kachamkurissi Vishnu Temple Arattu
 Desavilakku (Various Bhagavathi Temples) Festivals
 Panangattiri Koothandavela
 Alampallam Car Festival
Shoora samhara mahotsavam
Sivarathri Festivals

Kollengode Block Panchayat 
Grama panchayats under Kollengode block panchayat are,

 Kollengode
 Koduvayur
 Puthunagaram
 Vadavannur
 Muthalamada

Gallery

References

External links

Gram panchayats in Palakkad district
Villages in Palakkad district